Hastings Shade (May 20, 1941 – February 9, 2010) was a former deputy chief of the Cherokee Nation.  He was a traditionalist, artist, and master level fluent speaker of the Cherokee language.

Background
Hastings Shade was born on May 20, 1941, in Tahlequah, Oklahoma. His parents were Tom and Leanna Stopp Shade.

Traditional artist
Hastings Shade was declared a Cherokee National Treasure in 1991 for his extensive traditional knowledge, particularly his ability to make Cherokee marbles by hand. He was the only known maker of Cherokee marbles (gadayosdi). He painstakingly fashioned the balls from limestone and they are about the size of a billiards ball.

He also made fishing and frog gigs that are sought after by collectors.

Deputy Chief
Shade served one term as deputy chief of the Cherokee Nation, from 1999 to 2003, with Chad Smith. In an unusual political move, Shade ran independently for deputy chief in 2003 but did not win the election. During his time in office, he helped develop the Cherokee Nation's language programs, specially the Cherokee language immersion programs for school children.

Personal
Shade was considered a fullblood Cherokee. However, since he was a sixth-generation descendant of Sequoyah, the inventor of the Cherokee syllabary, he no doubt had a degree of European ancestry, as Sequoyah himself was not a full blood Cherokee.  Hastings was married to Loretta Shade, also a master level fluent speaker of the Cherokee language. Together they lived in Lost City, outside of Hulbert, Oklahoma. Shade died on February 9, 2010, in Tulsa, Oklahoma. "He foremost was a gentleman and a traditionalist who was fluent in Cherokee language and conversant in Cherokee thought. He was a teacher," said Chad Smith.

Published works
 Shade, Hastings. Myths, Legends, and Old Sayings. Self-published, 1994. ASIN B0006RH39I
 Cowan, Agnes; Loretta Shade; Hastings Shade; Agnes Louise Clark; and Jane B. Noble. Cherokee–English Language Reference Book. Welling: Cross-Cultural Education Center Inc., 1995. ASIN B00182V8YQ.

References

External links
 Gigging: A Cherokee Elder Spears for his Supper. Wisconsin Public Radio piece audio about Hastings Shade

1941 births
2010 deaths
People from Tahlequah, Oklahoma
Native American male artists
Artists from Oklahoma
Writers from Oklahoma
20th-century Native Americans
21st-century Native Americans
Cherokee Nation politicians